is a retired Japanese footballer.

Career
On 5 February 2020, FC Gifu confirmed that 34-year old Yokoyama had decided to retire.

Club statistics
Updated to 2 January 2020.

References

External links

Profile at Kawasaki Frontale
Profile at Omiya Ardija
Profile at Hokkaido Consadole Sapporo

1985 births
Living people
Waseda University alumni
Association football people from Tokyo
Japanese footballers
J1 League players
J2 League players
Kawasaki Frontale players
Cerezo Osaka players
Omiya Ardija players
Hokkaido Consadole Sapporo players
Roasso Kumamoto players
FC Gifu players
Association football midfielders